Richard Joseph Bouchard (December 2, 1934 – September 10, 1996) was a Canadian ice hockey right winger.

Bouchard spent his junior days playing for the Quebec Frontenacs before being called up to the New York Rangers roster to play in his one and only NHL game during the 1954-55 NHL season.  He then played two games for the Western Hockey League's Winnipeg Warriors before spending two seasons with the Shawinigan Falls Cataracts of the Quebec Hockey League.  In 1958, Bouchard signed with the American Hockey League's Rochester Americans.  After a year of inactivity, Bouchard signed for the International Hockey League's St. Paul Saints, spending three seasons with the team before playing one final season for the St. Paul Rangers of the Central Professional Hockey League before retiring. After retirement Bouchard stayed in the Twin Cities area and coached the high school Richfield men's hockey from 1965 to 1973 then Apple Valley high school from 1976 to 1980. Bouchard went on to work as a scout for the NHL with the Minnesota North Stars from 1981 to 1988 and then with the Toronto Maple Leafs from 1991 until his death in 1996.

Personal life 
Bouchard married Leda Desharnais August 1958. Richard and Leda Bouchard had 5 children together named Bryan, Ronald, Guy, Lyse and Michelle.

See also
 List of players who played only one game in the NHL

External links
 

1934 births
1996 deaths
Canadian ice hockey right wingers
Ice hockey people from Manitoba
Minnesota North Stars scouts
New York Rangers players
Rochester Americans players
St. Paul Saints (IHL) players
Shawinigan-Falls Cataracts (QSHL) players
Winnipeg Warriors (minor pro) players